Carlyle is a ghost town in Wibaux County, Montana, United States, located approximately 1 to  miles west of the North Dakota border, sitting on a ranch, which  incorporated the once agricultural town into grazing land. Some of the buildings once a part of the town are just foundations, however, a farmstead east of the town is still standing, with the school house, grain elevators and a couple of the homes inside the town. Southeast of the town of Carlyle is the cemetery. Carlyle had a population of 221 in the 1940s, with access to the North Pacific Railroad branch out of Beach, North Dakota.

External links

Ghost towns in Montana
Montana articles lacking sources
Populated places in Wibaux County, Montana